We're the Chipmunks (Music from the TV Show) is the licensed soundtrack based on the Chipmunks 2015 television series ALVINNN!!! and the Chipmunks. It was released as a digital download on September 25, 2015 by Rhino Entertainment. A CD version was released on October 16, 2015. The entire album was written and produced by Ross Bagdasarian Jr. and Janice Karman.

As of 2017, the digital version is unavailable for purchase or streaming. The reason for this is currently unknown. However, CD copies of the album can still be purchased.

Track listing

References

2015 soundtrack albums
Alvin and the Chipmunks albums
Rhino Records soundtracks